January 2012

See also

References

 01
January 2012 events in the United States